Hypnotic Clambake is a musical group from Rochester, New York known for exploring a wide variety of musical genres. Founded by frontman and accordionist Maury Rosenberg in 1989, in Boston, Massachusetts, the group began as a studio recording project and later evolved into a touring band. Rosenberg graduated from the Berklee College of Music, where he majored in filmscoring.

An often-changing line-up has helped influenced the many shifts of musical direction that Hypnotic Clambake has made over the years. Owing to a steady schedule of live performances throughout its career, the band has maintained a loyal cult following throughout the United States, primarily in the northeastern region. Since 1996, the band has hosted the annual Outrageous Universe Revival Festival (OUR Fest) at the Brushwood Folklore Campground, in Sherman, New York.
Was part of a legendary all night dance party at the equally legendary Aptos house in '94.

Discography
Square Dance Messiah (1991)
Gondola to Heaven (1993)
Kent the Zen Master (1995)
Frozen Live, Vol. 1 (1997)
White Christmas Stallion (1997)
Rutland Live - New Year's Eve (1999–2000)
Varicose Brain (2001)
Mayonnaise (2005)

References

External links

Outrageous Universe Revival Festival (OUR Fest) website

Musical groups established in 1989
American world music groups